Hot Shot is a Taiwanese drama starring Jerry Yan of F4, Show Lo, and Wu Chun of Fahrenheit. It was produced by Comic International Productions (可米國際影視事業股份有限公司) and directed by Lin He Long (林合隆).

It was first broadcast in Taiwan on free-to-air China Television (CTV) (中視) from 27 July 2008 to 9 November 2008, on Sundays at 22:00 to 23:30 and cable TV Gala Television (GTV) Variety Show/CH 28 (八大綜合台) on 2 August 2008 to 15 November 2008, every Saturday at 21:30 to 23:00. This show was also broadcast in Hong Kong, China, Japan, South Korea, Vietnam, Indonesia and the Philippines.

Synopsis
In a school where academic reigns supreme and sports were relegated to a dusty corner of the campus, Li Ying vowed to revive the basketball team by volunteering to be the coach of the basketball team. Her first member was Yuan Da Ying, a boy from the countryside who was passionate for basketball but had no skills. Their recruitment went into a high gear when Dong Fang Xiang, a legendary basketball player, transferred to their school.

Around the same time, Yuan Da Ying fell for Zhan Jie Er, a scholarship student who reminds him of his childhood friend Gu Gu Ji. Things were complicated by the fact her family works for Dong Fang Xiang, who she also grew up with. Their encounter may just rewrite the school's basketball history.

Cast

Main Cast
Jerry Yan (言承旭) as Dong Fang Xiang 東方翔
Show Lo (羅志祥) as Yuan Da Ying 元大鷹
Wu Chun (吳尊) as Wu Ji Zun 無極尊
Zhou Cai Shi (周采詩) as Zhan Jie Er 湛潔兒/ Qiu Kui 球魁
Coco Jiang (蔣怡) as Li Ying 李贏
Zhang Yan Ming (張雁名) Du Fei 杜飛

Supporting Cast
George Hu (胡宇崴) as Wu Ji Wei 無極威
Ku Pao-ming as Li Zi Ping 李子平
Michael Zhang as Can 殘 / Ah Fu 阿福
Lin Bo Yan (林伯彥) as Qi Xiao Yun 齊嘯雲
Lin Qi Tai (林祺泰) as Qi Xiao Yu 齊嘯雨
Coco Chiang as Li Ying

Extended Cast
Zhao Shu Hai as Dong Fang Xu 東方旭
Yun Zhong Yue as Lao Lu 老路
Wang Xia (王俠) as Dong Fang Shou 東方朔
Ma Zhi Qin (馬之秦) as Tie Lan 鐵蘭
Wang Wei Ting (黃薇渟) as Lin Zi Xuan 林紫璇
Wang Jian Min as Ji Wang 紀網
Jiang Wei Wen (蔣偉文) as George
Xie Kun Da as Wang Jing 王竟
Han Run Zhong (韓潤中) as Li Ke 李克
Cai Ming Xun (蔡明勳) as Wen Huai Wen 溫懷文
Xu Jun Hao (許君豪) as Wang Gui 王貴
Gong Ji An as Sun Hao 孫浩
Lan Jun Tian (藍鈞天) as Jian Deng 賈登
Bu Xue Liang as Tang Long 唐龍
Guo Yan Jun as Ru Zhu 魯竹
Li Jia Hua (李佳驊) as Ge Li Ya 戈利亞

Cameo Roles
Yan Jia Le (顏嘉樂) as Flower store owner
Jian Han Zhong (簡翰忠) as Commentator
Qian Ding Yuan (錢定遠) as Commentator
Lee Hsing-wen (李興文) as Coach of He Yi
Na Wei Xun as Wang Ye 王爺
Li Guo Chao (李國超) as Coach of Xin Rui
Renzo Liu as Coach of Xiang Yang
Billy as Wang Ji Xiu
Wu Jian Hao as one of Yuan Da Ying's fans
Wang Chuan Yi as one of Dong Fang Xiang's fans

Soundtrack

Hot Shot Code Original Soundtrack (CD+DVD) (籃球火音樂聖典) was released on 11 August 2008 by Freya Lim, Nese, and Adrian Fu under Sony Music Entertainment (Taiwan). It contains ten songs, in which five songs are various instrumental versions of the five original songs. The album also includes a DVD.

Track listing

In addition, there are three songs not included in the original soundtracks: The opening theme song, which is "箇中強手" or "Best Of The Bunch - Hot Shot", and an insert song, "幸福不滅" or "Cause I Believe" by Show Lo from his Trendy Man album, and the ending theme song by Jerry Yan entitled "Yi Ban", released in his Freedom album.

Books
 Hot Shot Notebook / 籃球火的青春記事簿 - 
 Hot Shot TV Drama Novel / 籃球火電視小說 - 
 Hot Shot Making Of Photo Book (Normal Edition) / 籃球火幕後寫真書（平裝版）- 
 Hot Shot Making Of Photo Book (Deluxe Limited Edition) / 籃球火幕後寫真書（精裝限量版）-

Awards

References

External links
  CTV Hot Shot official homepage
  GTV Hot Shot official homepage

China Television original programming
Gala Television original programming
2008 Taiwanese television series debuts
2008 Taiwanese television series endings
Basketball television series